The Wilson Pickers is a country blues band formed in 2008 and comprises three Queenslanders, Ben Salter, Danny Widdicombe, Andrew Morris, and two Victorians, Sime Nugent and John Bedggood.

Their 2008 album, Land of the Powerful Owl, earned them a nomination for an ARIA Award for Best Blues & Roots Album and their 2010 album, Shake It Down, earned them second.

Band members

John Bedggood – fiddle, mandolin, backing vocals
Andrew Morris – acoustic guitar, vocals
Sime Nugent – harmonica, guitar, backing vocals
Ben Salter – banjo, vocals
Danny Widdicombe – resonator guitar, vocals

Discography

Studio albums

Live albums

Awards and nominations

AIR Awards
The Australian Independent Record Awards (commonly known informally as AIR Awards) is an annual awards night to recognise, promote and celebrate the success of Australia's Independent Music sector. The commenced in 2006.

|-
| AIR Awards of 2017
|You Can't Catch a Fish from a Train 
| Best Independent Blues and Roots Album
| 
|-

ARIA Music Awards
The ARIA Music Awards is an annual awards ceremony that recognises excellence, innovation, and achievement across all genres of Australian music. 

|-
| 2009
| Land of the Powerful Owl
| Best Blues & Roots Album
| 
|-
| 2010
| Shake It Down
| Best Blues & Roots Album
| 
|-
| 2016
| You Can’t Catch a Fish from a Train
| Best Blues & Roots Album 
| 
|-

Country Music Awards of Australia
The Country Music Awards of Australia is an annual awards night held in January during the Tamworth Country Music Festival. Celebrating recording excellence in the Australian country music industry. They commenced in 1973.
 

! 
|-
| rowspan="1"| 2017
| You Can’t Catch a Fish from a Train
| Alternative Country Album of the Year
| 
| rowspan="1"|
|-

References

Australian country music groups
Musical groups from Melbourne
Australian indie rock groups
Victoria (Australia) musical groups
Musical groups established in 2008